The Great Ten (Shi Hao Xia) or (十豪侠) are a team of Chinese comic book superheroes in the DC Comics Universe, who are sponsored by the government of the People's Republic of China. Appearing in comics published by DC Comics, they were introduced in 52 #6 (June 2006), and were created by Grant Morrison, J. G. Jones, and Joe Bennett. Several of the characters have a basis in Chinese mythology. Unlike conventional superhero monikers, their names are close to literal translations from the Chinese language.

Publication history
Grant Morrison explained the background to his creation of the team, in a pitch which also contained the outline for the Super Young Team:

The Great Ten returned in their own title, in 10-issue monthly mini-series, beginning in early November 2009 and produced by writer Tony Bedard and artist Scott McDaniel, with covers by Stanley Lau.

Fictional team biography

First appearing in 52 #6, the Great Ten's actions are hampered by bureaucracy. Three of the team's members were forced to sit out a battle with Green Lanterns Hal Jordan and John Stewart because they had not completed the required paperwork. Following the events in the Infinite Crisis story arc, as a signatory of the Freedom of Power Treaty China has entered into a Coalition with Khandaq, Iran, Uzbekistan, and Pakistan, leading the Great Ten to join forces with Black Adam on the battlefield. Later, in week #32, the Accomplished Perfect Physician saves Ralph Dibny from his rampaging teammate Yeti, and gains his help subduing and restoring him to his human self. The Accomplished Perfect Physician then shares with Dibny details about his life and powers, his role as a "super-functionary", and some cryptic advice about a coming crisis in the Middle East. The Great Ten later battle Black Adam when he invades China as part of his vendetta after the death of Isis in World War III. This also involves confrontations with several American based superheroes, as the Chinese government was willing to go so far as to launch nuclear missiles if their territory was violated. This portion of the stand-off was ended when the Great Ten lost contact with Beijing, leaving August General in Iron with the authority to allow international help - against his own wishes.

On the final page of Checkmate #3, the Checkmate ground team, on an infiltration mission in China, is discovered and cornered by The Immortal Man in Darkness. In Checkmate #4 the August General in Iron, Celestial Archer and Yao Fei the Accomplished Perfect Physician show up to support the Immortal Man in Darkness, after a brief skirmish both sides declare a truce. Later after Yao Fei prevents Count Vertigo (acting under secret orders from Amanda Waller) from stealing Chinese state secrets, the August General decides that Checkmate has betrayed the truce and orders their deaths, only the timely intervention of Green Lantern Alan Scott and the Chinese Ambassador saves the lives of Sasha's ground team.

In Checkmate #13-15 and Outsiders #47-49, the Checkmate team and the Outsiders are on an infiltration mission to Oolong Island. In Outsiders #48, they are attacked by The Immortal Man in Darkness and Chang Tzu has re-appeared, ready to experiment on the captured Sasha Bordeaux of Checkmate and Captain Boomerang, in the presence of August General in Iron.

Issue #1 details the Accomplished Perfect Physician's origin, and introduces eight deities from Chinese mythology led by the Jade Emperor. The pantheon includes Yu Huang the Jade Emperor and King of the Gods, Lei Kung the God of Thunder, Feng Po the God of Winds, Kuan Ti the God of War, Lei Zi the Goddess of Lightning and wife of Lei Kung, Chu Jiang a minor God of the Dead who rules the second level of Diyu, Gong Gong the God of Floods, and Chu Jung the God of Fire and father of Gong Gong.

Issue #2 details the Celestial Archer's origin, has the Old Chinese Gods have returned for vengeance. With the citizens of Lhasa caught in the middle, the Old Gods battle against the Great Ten, but the super functionaries are no match for the angry, ancient gods, not when one member – the Celestial Archer – chooses to turn against his team and fight alongside the gods.

Issue #3 details Thundermind's origin, he appears in times of need to defend China against evil and injustice. But when Thundermind joins the Great Ten in their battle against the Old Chinese Gods, he learns the startling secret that the Old Chinese Gods have been hiding – a secret so massive it could destroy all of China.

Issue #4 details the Immortal Man-in-Darkness' origin, while he battles Feng Po in Shanghai. Immortal Man-in-Darkness finally defeats Feng Po, and the Great Ten discover Feng Po is using Durlan technology and that the Old Chinese Gods are false.

Issue #5 details the August General in Iron's origin, explaining the classified Qinghai incident, fifteen years ago. In the Kunlun Mountains, the Old Chinese Gods plan to invade Hong Kong. Celestial Archer realizes that the Old Chinese Gods are not the actual gods and sends a message to the Great Ten from their headquarters.

Issue #6 details the Ghost Fox Killer's origin and early history as a deadly crime fighter in Hong Kong, introducing an informant she uses to gather information about the Chinese triads in China. It also introduces links between the Old Chinese Gods, Taiwanese triads and the Taiwanese government; resulting in escalation of conflict between the mainland and Taiwan, and an attack by Chu Jiang on the Hong Kong waterfront.

Issue #7 details the Seven Deadly Brothers's origin, as he and Accomplished Perfect Physician battle the gangster fight in Hong Kong while trying to apprehend Taiwanese government official, Ma Saihung. This issue also introduces a fight between the remaining Old Gods and Great Ten members August General, Ghost Fox Killer, and Shaolin Robot following the death of Chu Jiang.

Issue #8 details the Shaolin Robot's origin, continues the fight that was introduced at the end of the previous issue, concluding with the Jade Emperor's beheading by Shaolin Robot, Great Ten Directorate. The issue concludes with the telepathic interrogation of Taiwanese government leading to the discovery of the robot factory in the Gobi desert.

Issue #9 details the Mother of Champions' origin, and wraps up the series from the viewpoint of one of her latest children, sired by Socialist Red Guardsman. Socialist Red Guardsman's origins are only hinted at throughout the series, however, it is established he was the first Super-functionary and that he felt betrayed by his country. The Great Ten unite at the end, and team with the remaining "false gods" to destroy the robot army created by a rogue Taiwanese general.

In the Watchmen sequel Doomsday Clock, China takes advantage of "The Superman Theory" by having the Great Ten expanded into the Great Twenty. Besides Accomplished Perfect Physician, August General-in-Iron, Celestial Archer, Ghost Fox Killer, Immortal Man-in-Darkness, Mother of Champions, Seven Deadly Brothers, Shoalin Robot, Socialist Red Guardsman, and Thundermind, it is mentioned that the other members include China's versions of Super-Man, Bat-Man, Flash, and Wonder-Woman, Gloss, Dao, Guanxi, Night-Dragon, Ri, and Striker-Z.

Membership

This team of "super-functionaries" (the communist Chinese ethos rejects the word 'heroes' for a humbler one) is based in China's Great Wall complex. This massive complex houses the team's command and support technicians as well as facilities for the creation of more Chinese superhumans. The bureaucracy must approve every action the Great Ten take during combat.

Accomplished Perfect Physician
Accomplished Perfect Physician or 達医者完 (Dá Yī Zhĕ Wán), Yao Fei was born a peasant in the Anhui Province. Yao had dreams of becoming a doctor but lacked the money for medical school. He enlisted in the army instead. When his unit was sent to suppress an uprising in Gyantse, Tibet, Yao killed a monk named Tenzin Cering. Horrified at what he'd done, he deserted his unit and was shot by his commanding officer. He was saved by a local medicine man who told Yao that his son, Tenzin, was supposed to be the seventeenth man to hold the position of the "Accomplished Perfect Physician"; since Tenzin was now dead, Yao was forced to take his place by Tenzin's father. Tenzin tossed Yao through a magical portal, wherein he was filled with the memories and powers of the past Physicians. As the new Accomplished Perfect Physician, Yao was branded an outlaw and an enemy of the state for many years before he willingly joined the Great Ten.

With simple vocal sounds, the Accomplished Perfect Physician can produce a variety of magical effects, such as physical or mental paralysis, force fields, the redirection of energies, healing, destruction of matter, and earthquakes. The diplomat of the team, the Physician appears to be a collected individual with well-developed people skills. He does not get along well with his team leader, August General in Iron, who sees Yao only as an irreverent deserter.

August General in Iron
The August General in Iron or 钢铁圣将 (Gāng Tiě Shèng Jiāng) is Fang Zhifu formerly a member of a "Xeno-Team", an elite Chinese spec ops unit trained for encounters with aliens. 15 years ago, his unit was sent to investigate a Durlan ship that crashed in Qinghai province. The Durlans wiped out his unit with a flesh-melting pathogen weapon. Fang barely survived by injecting himself with a counter-agent that slowed the degeneration. Chinese scientists subjected him to special treatments which saved his life, but also endowed him with superhuman strength and caused his skin to grow iron-like plates. He was then recruited into China's new metahuman division. He wields a staff that can easily slice through metal.

August General in Iron is the field leader of the Great Ten and while he commands the Great Ten, he must still run all command decisions in the field by the Central Committee. He also serves as the Black King's Bishop in Checkmate. He met Ghost Fox Killer in Hong Kong. For some reason, he was immune to her deathly touch, and the two became lovers instead. As a fanatical soldier, he despises the Accomplished Perfect Physician for his irreverent attitude and for deserting the army.

Fang Zhifu habitually quotes from Sun Tzu's The Art of War.

In The New 52 (a reboot in DC Comics), August General in Iron is invited to join the new Justice League International, with the United Nations council that assembled the group noting that he was selected because he represents "the world's most populous nation". His comments about the superiority of Chinese engineering quickly draw the ire of Rocket Red.

Celestial Archer
The Celestial Archer or 天体射手 (Tiān Tĭ Shè Shŏu) is a figure with ties to Chinese mythology. As a teenager, Xu Tao sold souvenirs at the foot of Mount Tai. After his father's business was shut down by corrupt police, he joined a gang to support his family. He was not a good thief, however, and a botched robbery landed his fellow gang members in jail. When they were released, they sought his death. They chased him to an old temple below Mount Tai. While hiding behind a tree, Tao was swallowed up by the earth, and found himself in a cavern where he found the Celestial Bow of Yi. The magical bow begged Tao to take it as his own, as it was dying after four thousand years of disuse. When Tao picked it up, he was transformed into the Celestial Archer and granted Yi the Archer's godlike archery skills. After chasing away his former gang, he instinctively fired an arrow at the moon, creating a magical bridge that took him to the home of the Chinese gods. The gods tasked him to serve as their agent on Earth, to inspire the Chinese and remind them of the old gods, whose worship was suppressed by the Communist government.

The Celestial Archer has unerring aim capable of shooting arrows charged with a mysterious energy, or that can turn day into night.

Xu is an irreverent character, disrespectful of August General's authority. He considers his role in the Great Ten as secondary to his divine mission, something which landed him in trouble when he foolishly defected to a team of metahumans posing as Chinese deities.

Ghost Fox Killer
The Ghost Fox Killer or 鬼狐杀手 (Guǐ Hú Shā Shǒu) is a female emissary from the hidden colony of "Ghost Fox Women". She is charged with killing evil men, and has power over the ghosts of those men. Apparently her home city is powered by the souls of evil men, and her touch causes instant death. She is typically accompanied by a rui shi (or Imperial guardian lion) of living jade. If Ghost Fox Killer does not kill off evil men for her colony, her society will fall. She encounters August General in Iron early in her career, and is stunned to discover that she can touch his body without killing him. She has demonstrated undefined feelings of loyalty towards him.

Immortal Man-in-Darkness
Fifteen years ago, a Durlan ship crashed in China's Qinghai province. The Chinese reverse-engineered the craft and used the technology to build the Dragonwing, the most advanced fighter plane in the world. The pilot sits in a cockpit filled with a sort of amniotic fluid, bonding himself to the craft. This type of bond gradually breaks down a human's molecular structure; each flight takes a year off the pilot's life. The Dragonwing has been flown by a succession of PLAAF pilots, all of whom knowingly sacrificed themselves to serve China as the Immortal Man-In-Darkness or 黑暗中的不朽者 (Hēi Àn Zhōng De Bù Xiǔ Zhě). The current pilot is Chen Nuo. He operates from Anshan Air Base but makes his home in Shanghai.

The Dragonwing is a powerful shapeshifting aircraft. It can take the form of diffuse smoke and handle hurricane-force winds.

Mother of Champions
Wu Mei-Xing, the Mother of Champions or 冠軍母亲 (Guàn Jūn Mǔ Qīn) was a theoretical physicist, working on a particle accelerator when she was briefly exposed to a theoretical "god particle", which mutated her system by triggering her metagene. At first she was unable to bear children, but eventually discovered her super-fecundity powers by accident. She no longer needs to eat, and has to remind herself to breathe, and she is immune to radiation poisoning from ionizing radiation. She can now birth a litter of twenty-five genetically identical supersoldiers about every three days. These children are short-lived, however, only lasting one week, aging ten years every twenty four hours. She has at times used a metallic chair with insect-like legs to remain mobile during her pregnant state. She later pretended that the alias "Niang Guan Jun" was her real name.

One of her superstrong children named Number Four appeared in The OMAC Project: Infinite Crisis Special #1. In Nightwing #144, Mother of Champions is kidnapped from the Great Wall Complex by operatives of Talia al Ghul; in this same issue it is revealed that she has had thousands of children, and that each batch of superhuman children are conceived by suitors whom she hand picks. Her children appear to demonstrate fairly standard superhuman abilities, save for when she has the children of fellow Great Ten members. She has had children with Seven Deadly Brothers, Accomplished Perfect Physician, at least one Immortal Man-in-Darkness, and most recently with Socialist Red Guardsman.

Seven Deadly Brothers
Yang Kei-Ying, known as the Seven Deadly Brothers or 致命七兄弟 (Zhì Mìng Qī Xiōng Dì), was born in poverty in Fujian province over 300 years ago. He was a soldier in service to the Yongzheng Emperor in 1723, and took part in the destruction of the Shaolin Temple. One of the temple's kung fu grandmasters, Bak Mei, defected to the Emperor and helped destroy the second temple. Yang was impressed with Bak Mei's skill and wanted to learn kung fu himself, but Bak Mei laughed at him and thought him unpromising. He deserted the army and headed to the school of the Seven Scribes of the Cloudy Satchel, seven taoist sorcerers in the mountains near Song Shan. Yang begged to become a pupil and fed the sorcerers all manner of excuses and lies, but the sorcerers saw through him and placed a curse on him as punishment for his evil actions. They placed in his mind complete knowledge of all seven schools of kung-fu and a lust for violence, and sent him back to slaughter Bak Mei and the soldiers who had destroyed the Shaolin temples. Centuries later, he was incorporated into the Great Ten and fabricated his origin, claiming that he received his powers from an old mystic whom he saved from a beating.

When entering battle, Yang splits into seven identical clones, each a grandmaster of one of the seven schools of kung-fu.

Shaolin Robot
When the First Emperor of China commissioned the construction of his tomb, a brilliant engineer by the name of Lao Yuqi built a hundred clockwork automatons to serve as tomb guards. The vain and jealous emperor ordered that Lao be entombed with him upon his death so that his genius would never serve another patron. Before dying of thirst, Lao reprogrammed one of the automatons with his own insights, values and priorities and gave it a semblance of free will. Thousands of years later, when the tomb was uncovered by archaeologists, the automatons went on a rampage in an attempt to topple the Communist government and restore imperial rule. These automatons were defeated by the Super Functionaries. Only Lao's reprogrammed automaton remained inactive back at the tomb. The Chinese government reactivated it and upgraded it with Durlan technology.

Shaolin Robot speaks in simple I Ching hexagrams, but can express more complex thoughts using written pinyin. It was seen using hexagrams from I Ching to speak. In 52 #50, Shaolin Robot 'speaks' three times. Springing forward to attack Black Adam, it speaks , Hexagram 38, which is 睽 (kui2), and represents opposition or contradiction. In the next frame, while actively attacking Black Adam, it speaks , Hexagram 6, 訟 (song4), which represents contention or arguing. Finally, as Black Adam destroys Shaolin Robot, it speaks , Hexagram 23, 剝 (bol), which represents deterioration or 'splitting apart'. Later while battling the Shield, it speaks , Hexagram 18 which is '蠱' (correction), Hexagram 39 which is '蹇' (obstruction), Hexagram 25 which is '無妄' (pestilence), and finally , Hexagram 1, which is '乾' (force).

Socialist Red Guardsman
Real name Gu Lao, is one of the oldest Chinese heroes. He used his solar powers to carry out the Cultural Revolution. His body is highly radioactive, so he is forced to wear special armor reverse engineered from Durlan technology. He has since become bitter and disillusioned as China abandons Mao Zedong's vision and embraces market economics. He lives like a hermit in an isolated stretch of the Gobi Desert due to the possible threat of a nuclear meltdown. Mother of Champions is immune to his radiation, and was the first person to touch him in over fifteen years.

Thundermind
Thundermind or 雷念 (Léi Niàn) is Zou Kang, a history teacher at Beijing No. 8 Middle School who, on a tour of the Beijing Museum, accidentally recites aloud a sanskrit "trigger phrase" from an ancient Buddhist artifact. Afterwards, he transforms into Thundermind whenever he recites his trigger phrase and unlocks what he calls his full human potential, becoming a Bodhisattva with the power to access metahuman analogues of the powers listed in the Buddhist siddhis. He saves a fellow teacher named Miss Wu, who happens to be in love with his alter ego Thundermind. He also has super-senses akin to telepathy, and fancies himself the team's conscience. He is the most loved of the Great Ten, especially in his hometown of Beijing.

Reserve members

Chang Tzu

As revealed to Alan Scott by Thundermind, Chang Tzu and his Science Squad are members of the Great Ten that provide, among other things, the funds to operate the organization and the technology they use.

Number Four
Number Four was one of Mother of Champions' superstrong and tough children. Number Four was sent into Saudi Arabia to retrieve the fallen OMAC satellite, he demonstrated superhuman strength, invulnerability and heightened reflexes, Number Four is a reference to the 14th Century Chinese myth of the Ten Brothers, the fourth having super strength.

Shen Li Po
Shen Li Po was formerly the Black King's Bishop in Checkmate. Shen Li Po later returned to the Great Wall Complex on a leave of absence and was replaced by the August General In Iron.

The Yeti
Real name Hu Wei. The Yeti is a scientist who unlocked an atavistic trigger gene that transforms men into monsters. This discovery enabled him to transform into a powerful white furred yeti-like monster plagued with an uncontrollable rage. While in his Yeti form, Hu Wei must wear a special electronic amulet around his neck that keeps him from going berserk. He was killed in 52 #50 by Black Adam.

Other versions

Anti-Matter Universe
There is an evil counterpart to the Great Ten in the Anti-Matter Universe, known as "The Most Unworthy Ten".

Flashpoint
In the alternate timeline of the Flashpoint event, August General in Iron is a member of the H.I.V.E. council. He voted for innocent civilians to live in Western European between Aquaman and Wonder Woman before using nuclear weapons to end the war.

In other media

Television
Yao Fei appears in the TV series Arrow portrayed by Byron Mann. This version, named Yao Fei Gulong, is a Chinese Army deserter with unspecified medical training. Yao Fei is the father of Shado (and the reason Yao Fei is later allied with Edward Fyers and Billy Wintergreen), and he acts as Oliver Queen's mentor on the island he is shipwrecked on, Lian Yu. He also resembles the Celestial Archer as this version of Yao Fei is extremely proficient with a bow and arrow, but a skilled martial artist as well, proficient enough to combat Wintergreen. He is killed by Fyers in "Darkness on the Edge of Town". His full name is revealed only in the fifth-season episode "Second Chances" and he was also one of Talia al Ghul's disciples when he became an archer. He appears as a hallucination to Oliver in "Missing", during his captivity on the island by Konstantin Kovar, telling him that despite losing loved ones and all troubles what he encountered in five years, to not give up and that Oliver can rise up against all kinds of danger. He returns in season eight episode "Purgatory" when energy build-up on the island restored him, along with Fyers and his group. He helps Oliver and his team to fight against Fyers. After Lyla Michaels activates the weapon that is tied to her DNA, the energies are absorbed causing Yao Fei, Fyers and others who died earlier to disappear.

The Great Ten are among the many superhero and supervillain teams whose names can be read on the wall during a musical number in Batman: The Brave and the Bolds musical episode, "Mayhem of the Music Meister".

Miscellaneous
A version of the Great Ten appears in issue #8 of the Batman: The Brave and the Bold comics. They help Batman fight an army of Yetis.

References

External links
Cosmic Teams: The Great Ten
DC’s The Great Ten Preview Gallery, Newsarama
Straight (and Not) Out of the Comics, New York Times, May 28, 2006

Characters created by Grant Morrison
Comics characters introduced in 2006
DC Comics superhero teams
Chinese superheroes
Fictional archers
Fictional dectets